9 to 5 is an American sitcom based on the 1980 film of the same name, that aired originally aired on ABC and later in syndication. 9 to 5 features Rachel Dennison, Dolly Parton's younger sister, in Parton's role of Doralee Rhodes; Rita Moreno portrayed the Lily Tomlin role of Violet Newstead, and Valerie Curtin took the Jane Fonda role of Judy Bernly. In the truncated third season, Curtin's Judy Bernly was replaced with Leah Ayres as secretary Linda Bowman. In the second version of the show, Sally Struthers replaced Moreno, and Curtin returned as Judy. 9 to 5 premiered on March 25, 1982, and ended on March 26, 1988, with a total of 85 episodes over the course of 5 seasons. The season 3 episodes "Dog Day Afternoon" and "Pillow Talk" never aired.

Series overview

Episodes

Season 1 (1982)

Season 2 (1982–83)

Season 3 (1983)

Season 4 (1986–87)

Season 5 (1987–88)

References

External links
 
 

Lists of American sitcom episodes